Danta Bai, also called Dan ta bai, is a village in Boven Suriname municipality (resort) in Brokopondo District in Suriname.

Danta Bai can be reached by car on the way from Paramaribo, Eight kilometers before Pokigron to the left. There are a number of group accommodations. The flow of the river is strong here. One can reach it by boat from Pokigron as well.

Nearby towns and villages include Abenaston (4.1 nm), Pokigron (1.4 nm), Mofina (15.8 nm), Baikoetoe (4.2 nm) and Zoewatta (3.6 nm).

References

Populated places in Sipaliwini District